Her Majesty's Principal Secretary of State for Exiting the European Union or, informally, Brexit Secretary, was a secretary of state in the Government of the United Kingdom, responsible for the business of the Department for Exiting the European Union, as well as for the UK's withdrawal from the European Union (EU), informally referred to as "Brexit". The secretary of state oversaw Brexit negotiations following a 2016 referendum, in which a majority voted in favour of exiting the EU. The officeholder was a member of the Cabinet.

The position was created on 13 July 2016, at the outset of the premiership of Theresa May. The office was abolished on 31 January 2020, as the United Kingdom left the European Union. A new cabinet position of Minister of State for Brexit Opportunities and Government Efficiency was later created.

The Minister of State for Exiting the European Union deputised for the secretary of state. The corresponding shadow minister was the Shadow Secretary of State for Exiting the European Union. The secretary of state was also scrutinised by the Exiting the European Union Select Committee.

This page also includes the portfolios of Chief Negotiator for Exiting the European Union and Parliamentary Under-Secretary of State for Exiting the European Union.

History
May reportedly ordered civil servants to find a building to house a new Department for Exiting the European Union, to be headed by the secretary of state. The headquarters of the Department of Energy and Climate Change (DECC) at Whitehall Place, which was to be vacated once the DECC was merged into the newly created Department for Business, Energy and Industrial Strategy, was viewed as a potential site for the department. The department later occupied 9 Downing Street.

The inaugural holder was David Davis MP, a longtime Eurosceptic who campaigned for the UK to leave the EU. Davis is a former chairman of the Conservative Party who served  in the government of John Major as Minister of State for Europe (1994–97) and in the Shadow Cabinet of David Cameron as shadow home secretary.

Davis resigned on 8 July 2018 shortly before midnight; Dominic Raab was appointed on 9 July as his replacement and resigned on 15 November 2018. Steve Barclay, who had been serving as Minister of State for Health, was selected as Raab's successor on 16 November 2018.

List of secretaries of state for exiting the European Union (Brexit Secretaries)

Colour key (for political parties):

List of Chief Negotiators for Exiting the European Union
Colour key (for political parties):

List of Ministers of State for Exiting the European Union

List of Parliamentary Under-Secretaries of State for Exiting the European Union
Colour key (for political parties):

See also

 Minister of State for Europe
 Shadow Secretary of State for Exiting the European Union
 Cabinet Secretary for Government Business and Constitutional Relations

References

External links
 Davis' resignation letter and May's reply in full, BBC News, 9 July 2018
 Department for Exiting the European Union

2016 establishments in the United Kingdom
2020 disestablishments in the United Kingdom
Brexit
Consequences of the 2016 United Kingdom European Union membership referendum
Lists of government ministers of the United Kingdom
Ministerial offices in the United Kingdom
Ministers and ministries responsible for European affairs

United Kingdom and the European Union
Defunct ministerial offices in the United Kingdom